Gianfranco "Franco" Lombardi (20 March 1941 – 22 January 2021) was an Italian professional basketball player and coach. During his playing career, his nickname was "Dado". In 2006, he was inducted into the Italian Basketball Hall of Fame.

Professional playing career 
During his club career, Lombardi led the top-tier level Italian League in scoring, in 1964 and 1967.

National team playing career 
Lombardi was a part of the senior Italian national basketball teams that won a gold medal at the 1963 Mediterranean Games and finished in the fourth, fifth and eighth places at the 1960 Summer Olympics, the 1964 Summer Olympics, and the 1968 Summer Olympics, respectively.

Coaching career 
After he retired from playing basketball, Lombardi had a long coaching career, working as a head coach for numerous teams in the Italian League.

Eurovision Song Contest 1987 
In 1987, at the Eurovision Song Contest in Brussels, Belgium, he conducted the Italian entry, "Gente di mare", performed by Umberto Tozzi and Raf, placing third with 103 points, and receiving the maximum score of 12 points from 5 national juries.

References

External links 

Sports-Reference.com Player Profile
Italian League Coach Profile 

1941 births
2021 deaths
AMG Sebastiani Basket coaches
AMG Sebastiani Basket players
Basketball players at the 1960 Summer Olympics
Basketball players at the 1964 Summer Olympics
Basketball players at the 1968 Summer Olympics
Basket Rimini Crabs coaches
Fortitudo Pallacanestro Bologna players
Italian basketball coaches
Italian men's basketball players
1963 FIBA World Championship players
1967 FIBA World Championship players
Mens Sana Basket coaches
Olympic basketball players of Italy
Pallacanestro Cantù coaches
Pallacanestro Reggiana coaches
Pallacanestro Treviso coaches
Pallacanestro Trieste coaches
Pallacanestro Varese coaches
Scaligera Basket Verona coaches
Small forwards
S.S. Basket Napoli coaches
Virtus Bologna players